Saldus Municipality is a municipality in Courland, Latvia. The municipality was formed in 2021 by merging Saldus Municipality (2009-2021) and Brocēni Municipality. Saldus Municipality contains 19 Parishes and 2 Towns. (Saldus town, Ezere Parish, Jaunauce Parish, Jaunlutriņi Parish, Kursīši Parish, Lutriņi Parish, Nīgrande Parish, Novadnieki Parish, Pampāļi Parish, Ruba Parish, Saldus Parish, Šķēde Parish, Vadakste Parish, Zaņa Parish, Zirņi Parish, Zvārde Parish, Brocēni town, Remte Parish, Blīdene Parish, Ciecere Parish, Gaiķi Parish)  The population in 2021 was 27 110.

Population

Patron of the University of Latvia 
Saldus municipality is a silver patron of the University of Latvia Foundation. Supported the University of Latvia in 2013-2019, when it established a scholarship “Medusmaize”, which is intended for young people of their region who, after graduating from high school, start basic studies in one of the Latvian universities. If the criteria are met, support is provided throughout the bachelor's degree.

See also 

 Administrative divisions of Latvia

References 

 
Municipalities of Latvia